The 2012 Lotto–Decca Tour was the first edition of Lotto–Decca Tour, a women's cycle stage race in Belgium. The tour was held from 25 August to 27 August, 2012. The tour with an UCI rating of 2.2 started in Nijlen, and ended in Geraardsbergen. 158 cyclists started and 74 of them finished the tour.

Stages

Stage 1
25-08-2012 – Nijlen to Nijlen, 
The first stage started at 14:00 and was scheduled to end between 16:28 and 16:38. The race had four intermediate sprints. The race ended in a bunch sprint, won by Kirsten Wild ahead of Ellen van Dijk and Jolien D'Hoore.

Stage 2
26-08-2012 – Dendermonde to Dendermonde,

Stage 3
27-08-2012 Geraardsbergen — Geraardsbergen,

Final standings

General Classification

References

External links
 Official website

Lotto-Decca Tour
Lotto-Decca Tour
Lotto-Decca Tour